McRefugee is a neologism and McWord referring to those who stay overnight in a 24-hour McDonald's fast food restaurant.

The term was first created in Japanese: . In Japan, most McDonald's restaurants  are operated around the clock. Due to unemployment, high rents, and transportation costs in Japan, McRefugees choose to stay at a McDonald's overnight.

McDonald's opened 24-hour branches in mainland China in September 2006, which quickly attracted McRefugees.

In early October 2015, the death of a woman in a 24-hour Hong Kong McDonald's restaurant in Kowloon Bay brought attention to the phenomenon of McRefugees. McRefugees can be found in other 24-hour branches as well. Among the more than 1,600 homeless people in Hong Kong in 2015, about 250 were McRefugees.

In 2018, a study conducted by the Society for Community Organization found that there were 384 McRefugees in Hong Kong. In August of the same year, a movie concerning about this topic started to film in Hong Kong, with the title I'm Livin' It, mimicking the slogan of the restaurant, "I'm loving it".

See also
NEET
Parasite single
Net cafe refugee, a similar concept in Japan.

References

Refugee
Society of Japan
Economy of Japan
Economy of Hong Kong
Economy of China
Homelessness